Two ships of the Japanese Navy have been named Awaji:

 , a  launched in 1943 and sunk in 1944
 , an  launched in 2015

Japanese Navy ship names